Notelaea linearis, also known as the native olive, is a species of flowering plant in the olive family that is endemic to Australia.

Description
The species grows as a shrub to about 2 m in height. The linear, or lance-shaped, leaves are 20–70 mm long and 7–12 mm wide. The inflorescences of about four pale yellow flowers are 4–10 cm long. The white or blue oval fruits are 5–7 mm long and 4–5 mm wide.

Distribution and habitat
The species occurs in north-eastern New South Wales and south-eastern Queensland, where it grows in dry sclerophyll forest and heathy scrub, usually on a granite substrate.

References

 
linearis
Flora of New South Wales
Flora of Queensland
Lamiales of Australia
Taxa named by George Bentham
Plants described in 1868